Shahrak-e Almahdi (also Romanized as Shahrak-e Almahdī) is a village in Pachehlak-e Gharbi Rural District, in the Central District of Azna County, Lorestan Province, Iran. At the 2006 census, its population was 4,116, in 958 families, making it the most populous village in Azna County.

References 

Towns and villages in Azna County